The number of elections in Arkansas varies by year, but usually municipal elections occur every year, plus primary and general elections for federal and state offices occur during even-numbered years.

The state was historically part of the Solid South, and was a one-party state dominated by Democrats. Arkansas was the only state in the nation not carried by Republicans at least once between 1876 and 1968, although it voted for segregationist George Wallace in 1968. It was the only Deep South state carried by Lyndon Johnson in 1964, just following the passage of the Civil Rights Act, however, Democratic support did weaken after this. The state voted Republican for the first time in 100 years in 1972, and became a swing state, voting for the national winner in every election from 1972 to 2004. In 2008, the state continued in rightward turn in the 21st century, when Democrat Barack Obama became the first Democrat to win the presidency without carrying the state. Democrats lost control of all statewide and congressional offices by 2014 and lost the state legislature in 2012. 

In a 2020 study, Arkansas was ranked as the 9th hardest state for citizens to vote in.

Elections

Gubernatorial

2022 Arkansas gubernatorial election
2018 Arkansas gubernatorial election
2014 Arkansas gubernatorial election
2010 Arkansas gubernatorial election
2006 Arkansas gubernatorial election
2002 Arkansas gubernatorial election

Senatorial
2022 United States Senate election in Arkansas
2020 United States Senate election in Arkansas
2016 United States Senate election in Arkansas
2014 United States Senate election in Arkansas
2010 United States Senate election in Arkansas

See also
 United States presidential elections in Arkansas
 2020 Arkansas elections
 Women's suffrage in Arkansas

References

External links
 
  (State affiliate of the U.S. League of Women Voters)
 
 

 
Elections